Tenellia behrensi is a species of sea slug, an aeolid nudibranch, a marine gastropod mollusc in the family Fionidae.

Distribution
This species was described from a single specimen found at 10 m depth at the Azuero Peninsula, Pacific Ocean coast of Panama.

References 

Fionidae
Gastropods described in 2007